The 1973 NCAA University Division baseball season, play of college baseball in the United States organized by the National Collegiate Athletic Association (NCAA) began in the spring of 1973.  The season progressed through the regular season and concluded with the 1973 College World Series.  The College World Series, held for the twenty seventh time in 1973, consisted of one team from each of eight geographical districts and was held in Omaha, Nebraska at Johnny Rosenblatt Stadium as a double-elimination tournament.  Southern California claimed the championship for the fourth year in a row, en route to five consecutive titles.

Realignment
Houston joined the Southwest Conference, leaving the ranks of independents.

Conference winners
This is a partial list of conference champions from the 1973 season.  Each of the eight geographical districts chose, by various methods, the team that would represent them in the NCAA Tournament.  13 teams earned automatic bids by winning their conference championship while 19 teams earned at-large selections.

Conference standings
The following is an incomplete list of conference standings:

College World Series

The 1973 season marked the twenty seventh NCAA Baseball Tournament, which culminated with the eight team College World Series.  The College World Series was held in Omaha, Nebraska.  The eight teams played a double-elimination format, with Southern California claiming their ninth championship, and fourth in a row, with a 4–3 win over Arizona State in the final.

Award winners

All-America team

References